Nikola Đorđević (also transliterated Nikola Djordjević; born 7 August 1994) is a Serbian football forward who plays for Sloga 33.

Career

Sloga Petrovac na Mlavi
Born in Petrovac na Mlavi, Đorđević passed the Sloga Petrovac school, and joined the first team at the age of 16. Playing for team he made 52 Serbian League West appearances and scored 9 goals until the 2013–14 season, when club was promoted in the Serbian First League. He also noted 4 caps with 2 goals for the first half of season, but after incindent with Bismarck Appiah, his father Milorad, who was the president resigned from that function at the club. Nikola also left the club and the spring half spent with Jedinstvo Bijelo Polje. He returned in his home club for the 2014–15 season, did not get many chances in the first half of season. In the second half he scored 6 goals on 12 Serbian First League matches including 2 against Sloga Kraljevo, when he was nominated for the man of the match. After he missed some period because of injury, Đorđević scored his first goal in the 2015–16 season against Bežanija on 18 November 2015. Later, he scored several important goals until the end of first half-season and confirmed the great form, which continued beginning of spring half scoring goals in matches against Inđija, and Radnički Kragujevac.

Career statistics

Honours
Sloga Petrovac
Serbian League West: 2012–13

References

External links
 

1994 births
Living people
People from Petrovac, Serbia
Serbian footballers
FK Sloga Petrovac na Mlavi players
FK Jedinstvo Bijelo Polje players
Serbian First League players
Serbian expatriate footballers
Serbian expatriate sportspeople in Slovakia
Expatriate footballers in Slovakia
FC VSS Košice players
2. Liga (Slovakia) players
FK Smederevo players
Association football forwards